Zhang Zuoha (born August 1950) is a Chinese politician of Yi ethnicity who served as governor of Liangshan Yi Autonomous Prefecture from 1999 to 2003. He was a delegate to the 12th National People's Congress.

Biography
Zhang was born in Yuexi County, Sichuan, in August 1950. During the Cultural Revolution, he was a sent-down youth from October 1969 to September 1973. After graduating from Chengdu Sport University in August 1976, he became a coach of the Sports Committee of Yuexi County.

Zhang began his political career in July 1981, when he was appointed deputy director of Yuexi County Culture and Education Bureau. He became leader of the Song and Dance Troupe of Liangshan Yi Autonomous Prefecture in February 1984, but having held the position for only two years. He was director of the Cultural Bureau of Liangshan Yi Autonomous Prefecture in March 1986 and subsequently director of Liangshan Yi Autonomous Prefecture Education Committee in December 1992. In August 1993, he rose to become vice governor of Liangshan Yi Autonomous Prefecture. He was deputy party secretary of Liangshan Yi Autonomous Prefecture in December 1995, in addition to serving as governor since March 1999. In January 2003, he was promoted again to vice governor of Sichuan, and served until October 2011, when he took office as a high counselor of Sichuan government.

References

1950 births
Living people
Yi people
People from Yuexi County, Sichuan
Chengdu Sport University alumni
Central Party School of the Chinese Communist Party alumni
People's Republic of China politicians from Sichuan
Chinese Communist Party politicians from Sichuan
Governors of Liangshan Yi Autonomous Prefecture
Delegates to the 12th National People's Congress